The 2014–15 Russian Premier League was the 23rd season of the Russian football championship since the dissolution of the Soviet Union and the 13th under the current Russian Premier League name.

The season began on August 1, 2014, when Rubin Kazan opened its season at home against Spartak Moscow. The season ended on May 29, 2015. Zenit won the championship, on 17 May, 2 rounds before the season ended.

Teams 

After the 2013–14 season, FC Anzhi Makhachkala and FC Volga Nizhny Novgorod were relegated to the 2014–15 Russian National Football League. Anzhi's relegation was confirmed on 11 May 2014 after losing 0–1 to FC Krasnodar, a result that came one year after the club finished third in the previous season, and thus returns to FNL after five seasons. FC Volga Nizhny Novgorod has been relegated after playing in the Russian Premier League for three seasons, during its first stint in Russia's top division. They have been replaced by two clubs which directly qualified from the 2013–14 Russian National Football League. FC Mordovia Saransk returned to the Premier League at its first attempt as FNL champions in the 2013–14 season, after being relegated from the Premier League in the season before. And 2013-14 FNL runner-up FC Arsenal Tula, which make their debut in Premier League for 2014–15 season, to play in top division of any level for the first time in its 68-year history.

On 18 and 22 May 2014, FC Tom Tomsk and FC Krylia Sovetov Samara also played their relegation playoff matches against FC Ufa and FC Torpedo Moscow respectively. The 2012-13 season FNL runner-up which has been directly promoted to Premier League season before, FC Tom Tomsk lost their relegation playoffs from FC Ufa (4th 2013-14 FNL) with 4–6 on aggregate. Ufa's qualification to the Premier League was all the more impressive considering that the club was founded at the end of 2010 and played its 2011–12 season in the second division. FC Krylia Sovetov Samara were also relegated to play in FNL in 2014–15 season, after they lose from FC Torpedo Moscow (3rd 2013-14 FNL) with 0–2 on aggregate, and the Moscow-based club will return to Premier League for the first time since the 2006 season. FC Krylia Sovetov Samara, as one of founding members of Russia's first division since breakup of the Soviet Union, will be playing outside top division for the first time since 1991.

Stadiums

Personnel and sponsorship

Managerial changes

Last updated: 2 June 2015

Tournament format and regulations

Basic 
The 16 teams played a round-robin tournament whereby each team plays each one of the other teams twice, once at home and once away. Thus, a total of 240 matches was played, with 30 matches played by each team.

Promotion and relegation 
The teams that finish 15th and 16th will be relegated to the RNFL, while the top 2 in that league will be promoted to the Premier League for the 2015–16 season.

The 13th and 14th Premier League teams will play the 4th and 3rd FNL teams respectively in two playoff games with the winners securing Premier League spots for the 2015–16 season.

League table

Relegation play-offs

First leg

Second leg

Ural Sverdlovsk Oblast won 1–0 on aggregate score and remained in the 2015–16 Russian Premier League.

Rostov won 5–1 on aggregate score and remained in the 2015–16 Russian Premier League.

Results

Positions by round
The table lists the positions of teams after each week of matches. In order to preserve chronological evolvements, any postponed matches are not included to the round at which they were originally scheduled, but added to the full round they were played immediately afterwards. For example, if a match is scheduled for matchday 10, but then postponed and played between days 25 and 26, it will be added to the standings for day 25.

Season events

Arsenal–CSKA game
On 16 March 2015, the league decided that the game between FC Arsenal Tula and PFC CSKA Moscow on 21 March 2015 can not be played at Arsenal Stadium due to unacceptable pitch condition. The backup stadium registered by Arsenal with the league for such occasions is MSA Lokomotiv in Moscow, where the game was moved, in effect making Arsenal visitors at their own home game. In protest, Arsenal manager Dmitri Alenichev decided to field the reserves squad for this game. Most of the players from the reserves teams are registered to play in league games, therefore the league could not reverse such a decision. 9 of the 11 Arsenal starters in the game (except for Sergei Kotov and Leonid Boyev) made their Premier League debut in the game. Kotov and Boyev had played in the Premier League for 185 combined minutes before this game. It was also a first game since 21 July 2012 in which one of the teams (in this case, Arsenal) did not play a single foreign player. CSKA won the game 4–1.

Season statistics

Scoring

 First goal of the season: Artem Dzyuba for Spartak Moscow against Rubin Kazan (1 August 2014)

Top goalscorers

Last updated: 30 May 2015

Hat-tricks

Round One Scoring Record
In the first round of matches, the 16 clubs (10 of which scored) combined for 34 goals to open the Russian Premier League, a new record that was elapsed even prior to Terek Grozny's home match against Amkar Perm on August 4. Ten of those goals came in Dinamo Moskva's 7-3 victory over FC Rostov.

Zenit Saint Petersburg winning record
Zenit started the competition with 8 victories in a row, beating the previous record set by FC Rubin Kazan in 2008 with 7.

Awards

Top 33
On 24 June 2015, Russian Football Union named its list of 33 top players:

Goalkeepers
 Igor Akinfeev (CSKA)
 Yuri Lodygin (Zenit)
 Sergey Ryzhikov (Rubin)

Right backs
 Mário Fernandes (CSKA)
 Igor Smolnikov (Zenit)
 Vitali Kaleshin (Krasnodar)

Right-centre backs
 Ezequiel Garay (Zenit)
 Vasili Berezutski (CSKA)
 Vedran Ćorluka (Lokomotiv)

Left-centre backs
 Nicolas Lombaerts (Zenit)
 Andreas Granqvist (Krasnodar)
 Sergei Ignashevich (CSKA)

Left backs
 Domenico Criscito (Zenit)
 Dmitri Kombarov (Spartak)
 Elmir Nabiullin (Rubin)

Defensive midfielders
 Bibras Natcho (CSKA)
 Javi García (Zenit)
 Odil Ahmedov (Krasnodar)

Right wingers
 Oleg Shatov (Zenit)
 Quincy Promes (Spartak)
 Zoran Tošić (CSKA)

Central midfielders
 Roman Eremenko (CSKA)
 Mathieu Valbuena (Dynamo)
 Roman Shirokov (Krasnodar)

Left wingers
 Danny (Zenit)
 Pavel Mamayev (Krasnodar)
 Alan Dzagoev (CSKA)

Right forwards
 Hulk (Zenit)
 Igor Portnyagin (Rubin)
 Ahmed Musa (CSKA)

Left forwards
 Ari (Krasnodar)
 Salomón Rondón (Zenit)
 Fyodor Smolov (Ural)

References

External links 

2014–15 Russian Premier League at Soccerway

Russian Premier League seasons
1
Russian Premier League|Rus